Krystal Murray (born 16 June 1993) is a dual code international rugby player for New Zealand. She competed for the Kiwi Ferns at the 2017 Women's Rugby League World Cup in Australia. She then made her test debut for the Black Ferns in 2021, she was a member of their 2021 Rugby World Cup champion squad. She also plays for Hurricanes Poua in the Super Rugby Aupiki competition and represents Northland provincially.

Rugby League Career 
Murray represented New Zealand at the 2017 Women's Rugby League World Cup.

Rugby Union Career

2021–2022 
Murray currently plays rugby union for the Northland Kauri in the Farah Palmer Cup. She played for the Blues against the Chiefs in the first-ever women's Super Rugby match in New Zealand on 1 May. 

Murray made her international debut for the New Zealand Black Ferns against England on 31 October at Exeter.

On 3 November 2021, She was named in the Blues squad for the inaugural Super Rugby Aupiki competition. She was named in the Blues starting line up for their first game, she scored a try against Matatū in their 21–10 victory. She started in their 0–35 trouncing by the Chiefs Manawa in the final round.

Murray was named in the Black Ferns squad for the 2022 Pacific Four Series. She played in the first test of the series against the Wallaroos. She was recalled into the team for a two-test series against the Wallaroos for the Laurie O'Reilly Cup in August.

Murray was selected for the Black Ferns 2021 Rugby World Cup 32-player squad. She scored a try in the second pool game against Wales. She came off the bench in the World Cup final against England, and scored a try only three minutes after running onto the field.

2023 
Murray signed with Hurricanes Poua for the second season of Super Rugby Aupiki.

References

External links
Black Ferns Profile

1993 births
Living people
New Zealand women's international rugby union players
New Zealand female rugby league players
New Zealand women's national rugby league team players
New Zealand female rugby union players